Montclair High School is a high school in Montclair, California. It is one of the twelve schools of the Chaffey Joint Union High School District. The school was a recipient of the Golden Ribbon Award from the California Department of Education in 2017  and a silver medalist for the U.S. News & World Report 2018 Best High Schools. Graduates from the Class of 2017 met the University of California A-G admission requirements at a rate of 51.4%, nearly 5% higher than the state average. The school received the California School Board Association's Golden Bell Award in 2017 for its Advancement Via Individual Determination (AVID) National Demonstration program.

History
Montclair High School is one of the oldest schools in the district. The school opened in September 1959 as one of the most modern schools in the area. The campus had two swimming pools and each classroom had air conditioning. Montclair High School's first class graduated in June of the following year in 1960.

Notes

References

External  links
Montclair High School
Chaffey Joint Union High School District
Alma B. Polk Library Media Center

High schools in San Bernardino County, California
Montclair, California
Public high schools in California
1960 establishments in California